The Timothy Mills House is a historic house built  and located at 27 Mills Street in the town of Morristown in Morris County, New Jersey. It was documented by the Historic American Buildings Survey in 1939. It was added to the National Register of Historic Places on February 24, 1975, for its significance in architecture.

See also
 National Register of Historic Places listings in Morris County, New Jersey
 List of the oldest buildings in New Jersey

References

External links
 
 

Morristown, New Jersey
Houses in Morris County, New Jersey
Houses on the National Register of Historic Places in New Jersey
National Register of Historic Places in Morris County, New Jersey
1740 establishments in New Jersey
New Jersey Register of Historic Places
Historic American Buildings Survey in New Jersey